Laurence Hyde may refer to:

Laurence Hyde, 1st Earl of Rochester (1641–1711)
Laurence Hyde (artist) (1914–1987), Canadian film maker, painter and graphic artist

See also
 Laurance M. Hyde (1892–1978), American jurist, chief justice of the Missouri Supreme Court
Lawrence Hyde (disambiguation)
Larry Hyde from Morbid Obscenity